The Indian Olympic archery team competes at the Summer Olympic Games in the sport of archery.

India first entered an archery team for the Summer Olympic Games in 1988, at the Seoul Summer games.

India entered three archers at the 1992 Barcelona Olympics

India entered three archers at the 1996 Atlanta Olympics

India entered six person archery team at the 2004 Athens Olympics

India entered four archers at the Beijing Olympics in 2008.

India entered with a six-person archery team in the London 2012 Olympics.

In the Rio 2016 Olympics, India's Atanu Das was the only individual from the Men's team to reach the Final, finishing equal 9th. In the Women's individual competition, Bombayla Devi Laishram and Deepika Kumari finished equal 9th and Laxmirani Majhi finished equal 33rd.

London Olympics 2012 Indian archery team members

The Indian men's archery team of Jayanta Talukdar, Rahul Banerjee and Tarundeep Rai was knocked out of the London Olympics on the opening day.

Beijing Olympics 2008 Indian archery team members

Athens Olympics 2004 Indian archery team members

Atlanta Olympics 1996 Indian archery team members

Barcelona Olympics 1992 Indian archery team members

Seoul Olympics 1988 Indian archery team members

References

Olympic archers of India
India at the Summer Olympics
Archery in India